The Lord of the Rings Dice Building Game is a dice-building game produced by WizKids. It is based on The Lord of the Rings film trilogy directed by Peter Jackson, and the book that inspired it, written by J. R. R. Tolkien. The game mechanics are often compared to Quarriors! though they are not identical.

Players must work together to assemble an army of dice representing the men, dwarves, elves, and hobbits to defeat the forces of Sauron. Some characters are tempted by the power of The One Ring and might work against the group however. Players take turns playing as the Ringbearer or playing as Sauron.

References

External links
 
 

Board games introduced in 2013
WizKids games
Multiplayer games
Fantasy games
Cooperative board games
Board games based on Middle-earth
Licensed board games
Mike Elliott (game designer) games
Eric M. Lang games